Ozark Adventist Academy (OAA) is a private, co-educational, college preparatory boarding school located near Gentry, Arkansas, United States.
It is a part of the Seventh-day Adventist education system, the world's second largest Christian school system.

History 
Founded in 1904 as a community church school, the school became Flint Creek Junior Academy and operated as a locally supported school until 1941, at which time it was taken over by the Arkansas-Louisiana Conference of Seventh-day Adventists and named Ozark Academy. In 1976, the name was changed to Ozark Adventist Academy. OAA is fully accredited with the Accrediting Association of Seventh-day Adventist Schools, Colleges, and Universities and by the Arkansas Nonpublic Schools Accrediting Association.

Campus 
The campus contains dorms for men and women, a cafeteria, and a gymnasium. The main administration building, known as the R. E. Callicott Educational Center, was officially opened by Mr. Callicott himself in a ribbon-cutting ceremony on February 5, 1978. This  structure houses offices, a laboratory, a library, a media center, a music department, an auditorium, and bathrooms.

Student body 
OAA has an enrollment of approximately 120 students.  Most of the student body resides on campus in the boy's and girl's residence halls.  The remainder commute from the community. According to the school's website, most OAA students are residents of Arkansas, Louisiana, Oklahoma, Texas, and Missouri. Although there are also some international students, from countries such as Mexico, China, South Korea, Tonga, Samoa, and Vietnam.

Academics 
The required curriculum at OAA includes classes in the following subject areas: Religion, English, Oral Communications, Social Studies, Mathematics, Science, Physical Education, Health, Computer Applications, Fine Arts, and Electives.

Students must successfully complete 24 units to graduate.  Graduates meeting specific additional requirements may earn one of the following:
 College prep diploma
 Honors diploma

Spiritual aspects
All students take religion classes each year that they are enrolled. These classes cover topics in biblical history and Christian and denominational doctrines. Instructors in other disciplines may begin each class period with prayer or a short devotional thought, and student input is encouraged. The entire student body gathers together in the auditorium each week for an hour-long chapel service.  There are other year-round spiritually oriented programs that rely on student involvement.

Extracurricular activities 
The OAA experience is shaped by events and extracurricular activities. Vespers is a church service where the students can pray and sing. Ozark Academy has a Student Association which plans banquets and other events. The Boy's Club and Girl's Club are two other associations that the school has. These associations elect officials annually.

The Student Olympics Association of Ozark Academy is the association that organizes the annual Olympics, held in mid-September. The Mountain Echo is an organization that publishes the school newspaper once every week. The Flintonian releases two publications: the first issue of The Flintonian is at the beginning of the year when the students enroll, and the last issue of The Flintonian is the school yearbook.

Athletics 

The Skyhawks are OAA's male basketball team. They have home and away games, with home games at the campus gymnasium. The Lady Hawks are the female basketball team. They also play home and away games. There are Football (soccer) matches played on the school field. OAA features intramural competitions in football, soccer, volleyball, basketball, and softball.

See also

 List of Seventh-day Adventist secondary schools
 Seventh-day Adventist education

References

External links 
 

Boarding schools in Arkansas
Christian schools in Arkansas
Educational institutions established in 1900
Private high schools in Arkansas
Schools in Benton County, Arkansas
Adventist secondary schools in the United States
1900 establishments in Arkansas
Gentry, Arkansas